The 1873 Armagh County by-election was held on 15 February 1873.  The byelection was held due to the death of the incumbent Conservative MP, Sir William Verner.  It was won by the unopposed Conservative candidate Edward Wingfield Verner.

References

1873 elections in the United Kingdom
By-elections to the Parliament of the United Kingdom in County Armagh constituencies
Unopposed by-elections to the Parliament of the United Kingdom (need citation)
19th century in County Antrim
February 1873 events
1873 elections in Ireland